Liñán is a Spanish surname.

Notable people with this surname include:
 Álvaro de Maldonado y de Liñán (1890–1963), Spanish diplomat
 Amable Liñán (born 1934), Spanish engineer
 Emilio Sagi Liñán (1900-1951), Spanish footballer
 Felipe Liñán (born 1931), Mexican cyclist
 José Pascual de Liñán y Eguizábal (1858–1934), Spanish writer
 Melchor Liñán y Cisneros (1629-1708), Peruvian archbishop

See also
 Linan